The Wade Point Light was a screw-pile lighthouse in North Carolina.

History
Lightship "M" was stationed at the mouth of the Pasquotank River off Albemarle Sound beginning in 1826. In 1855 it was replaced by a square screw-pile structure . This structure was eventually removed and replaced with the Pasquotank River Entrance Light, an automated tower about two miles NNE of the previous light.

References

Lighthouses in North Carolina
Lighthouses completed in 1855